Pardon, Are You For or Against? is a 1966 Italian comedy film written, directed and starred by Alberto Sordi.

The title refers to debates on the issue of divorce, still illegal in Italy at the time of the film's release.

Plot 
Tullio Conforti is a successful entrepreneur who is opposed to divorce on religious grounds. While claiming to be a role model, and that no other man is more faithful than him, he is de facto separated from his wife and has relations with many women.

Cast 

Alberto Sordi as Tullio Conforti
Silvana Mangano as Emanuela
Giulietta Masina as Anna
Anita Ekberg as Baroness Olga
Paola Pitagora as Valeria Conforti
Laura Antonelli as Piera
Bibi Andersson as Ingrid
Franca Marzi as Camilla
Lina Alberti as Celeste
Tina Aumont as Romina
Mario Pisu as Baron Renato Santambrogio
Eugene Walter as Igor
Mirella Pamphili as Fiorella Conforti
Maria Cumani Quasimodo as Baroness Cornianu
Caterina Boratto as Agnese Frustalupi
Enza Sampò as Interviewer
Dario Argento as Priest 
Lino Banfi as Pharmaceutical sales representative 
Marco Tulli as Doorman
Milena Milani as Herself
 Kitty Swan as Emanuela's employee

References

External links

1966 films
Italian comedy films
1966 comedy films
Films directed by Alberto Sordi
Films with screenplays by Dario Argento
Films scored by Piero Piccioni
1960s Italian-language films
1960s Italian films